"Desiderata" (Latin: "things desired") is the early 1920s prose poem by the American writer Max Ehrmann. The text was widely distributed in poster form in the 1960s and 1970s.

History
Max Ehrmann of Terre Haute, Indiana, wrote the work in the early 1920s, starting in 1921, but he did not use any title. He registered for his US copyright in 1927 via its first phrase. The April 5, 1933, issue of Michigan Tradesman magazine (No. 2585) published the full, original text on its cover, crediting Max Ehrmann as its author. In 1933 he distributed the poem in the form of a Christmas card, evidently entitling it "Desiderata" because a few days later he wrote in his Journal that a Kansas editor criticized his "Desiderata". Several years before 1942 a depressed woman gave psychiatrist Merrill Moore a copy of the poem without the name of the author, allowing him to hand out over 1,000 unattributed copies to his patients and soldiers during World War II. After Ehrmann died in 1945, his widow first published the work in 1948 in The Poems of Max Ehrmann. The Reverend Frederick Kates handed out about 200 unattributed copies to his congregation at Old Saint Paul's Church, Baltimore, during 1959 or 1960.

The 1948 version was in the form of one long prose paragraph, so earlier and later versions were presumably also in that form. Long after the author's death in 1945, hence not authorized by him, the work was partitioned into subparagraphs or stanzas.

The text was widely distributed in poster form in the 1960s and 1970s. It was first partitioned into a few subparagraphs separated by "distinctive spacing figures" in 1970 by Pro Arts and Crescendo Publishers. Later It was split into four or more subparagraphs separated by new lines in DePauw University's Mirage for 1978, and in the July/August 1999 issue of the Saturday Evening Post. In some versions, almost all instances of "and" are replaced by ampersands, "&". Other versions change "the noise and the haste" to "the noise and haste" and change "Be cheerful." to "Be careful.", notably the 1971 spoken word recording by Les Crane.

Copyright status

On January 3, 1927, Ehrmann registered "Go placidly amid the noise and the haste, etc." under US copyright number A 962402. In 1948, three years after Ehrmann's death, Bertha K. Ehrmann, his widow, included "Desiderata" in The Poems of Max Ehrmann, published that year by the Bruce Humphries Publishing Company of Boston. In 1954, she renewed the copyright.

In 1959 or 1960, the Reverend Frederick Kates, rector of Saint Paul's Church in Baltimore, Maryland, included "Desiderata" in a compilation of devotional materials for his congregation. The compilation included the church's foundation date, "Old Saint Paul's Church, Baltimore AD 1692," which readers subsequently took, and sometimes still do take, to be the date of the poem's composition.

In 1967, Robert L. Bell acquired the publishing rights from Bruce Humphries Publishing Company, where he was president, and then bought the copyright from Richard Wright, nephew and heir to the Ehrmann work.

In August 1971, the poem was published in Success Unlimited magazine, without permission from Robert L. Bell. In a 1975 lawsuit against the magazine's publisher, Combined Registry Co., the court ruled (and subsequently the Seventh Circuit Court of Appeals upheld) that copyright had been abandoned and forfeited because the poem had been authorized for publication without a copyright notice in 1933 and 1942 – and that the poem was therefore in the public domain.

However, Bell refused to recognize the Seventh Circuit Court of Appeals' decision. Because the Supreme Court declined to hear the case, the decision was only valid in the Seventh's jurisdiction, the states of Indiana, Illinois, and Wisconsin. Consequently, Bell continued to pursue others in other jurisdictions, either demanding they remove the poem from their publications, giving permission for a small portion to be published, or receiving royalties until his death in 2009.

Written works registered in the U.S. before 1928 entered the public domain in 2023.

Significant usages of the poem
 A Spanish language version by Mexican actor Arturo Benavides topped the Mexican charts for six weeks in 1972.
 Calling it "Spock Thoughts", Leonard Nimoy recited the poem on his 1968 album Two Sides of Leonard Nimoy. It also appeared on the 1995 re-release of Leonard Nimoy Presents Mr. Spock's Music from Outer Space. His rendition is not the only one to change the second-to-last sentence from "Be Cheerful" to "Be Careful".
 In 1971, Les Crane used a spoken-word recording of the poem as the lead track of his album Desiderata. His producers had assumed that the poem was too old to be in copyright, but the publicity surrounding the record led to clarification of Ehrmann's authorship and his family eventually receiving royalties. His version peaked at number 4 in Australia in December 1971.
 In 1972, National Lampoon released "Deteriorata", a parody of the poem and of Les Crane's spoken-word recording.
 In 2010, Ehrmann's home town of Terre Haute, Indiana, unveiled a bronze statue by Bill Wolfe of the author sitting on a park bench.
 In response to his government's losing its majority in the 1972 Canadian federal election, Prime Minister Pierre Trudeau reassured the nation by quoting Desiderata, "Whether or not it is clear to you, no doubt the universe is unfolding as it should."
 In the 1982 episode of The Professionals, "Discovered In A Graveyard", a framed copy is found in Ray Doyle's apartment and is read aloud by George Cowley.
 The actor Morgan Freeman, interviewed in 2012 on Oprah Winfrey's Master Class television special, explained how deeply the poem had shaped his life.
 The Voice of Peace broadcast Abie Nathan reading the Desiderata every day at sunset.
 When former Illinois Governor and United States ambassador to the United Nations Adlai Stevenson died in 1965, a guest in his home found a copy of the poem near his bedside and discovered that Stevenson had planned to use it in his Christmas cards. This contributed further to the poem becoming widely known.
 The poem was an inspiration for the marimba piece "Strive to be Happy" by Ivan Trevino, and was performed with marimba accompaniment at PASIC 2018.

References

External links
 

1927 poems
1971 singles
American poems
United States copyright case law